Norman Pentland (9 September 1912 – 28 October 1972) was a British Labour Member of Parliament.

Pentland was educated at Fatfield County School, then in 1926 became a miner, based at the Harraton Colliery.  In 1949, he was elected as a checkweighman, and by this time, he was heavily involved in the Durham Area of the National Union of Mineworkers, and the local Labour Party.

Pentland served on Chester-le-Street Rural District Council, and was its chair in 1952/53.  Also in 1952, he was elected to the executive committee of the Durham Miners.  He won a seat in Parliament at the 1956 Chester-le-Street by-election, and held ministerial office as Parliamentary Secretary to the Minister for Pensions from 1964 to 1966, Parliamentary Secretary to the Ministry of Social Security from 1966 to 1968, Under-Secretary of State for Social Services from 1968 to 1969, and Parliamentary Secretary to the Ministry of Posts and Telecommunications from 1969 until 1970.

In both 1971 and 1972, Pentland stood unsuccessfully to become Chair of the Parliamentary Labour Party.  He died in October 1972, aged 60.

References

External links 
 

1912 births
1972 deaths
Labour Party (UK) MPs for English constituencies
National Union of Mineworkers-sponsored MPs
UK MPs 1955–1959
UK MPs 1959–1964
UK MPs 1964–1966
UK MPs 1966–1970
UK MPs 1970–1974
Ministers in the Wilson governments, 1964–1970
People from Fatfield
Politicians from Tyne and Wear